George Keith Taylor (March 16, 1769 – November 9, 1815) was a United States circuit judge of the United States Circuit Court for the Fourth Circuit.

Education and career

Born on March 16, 1769, in Petersburg, Colony of Virginia, British America, Taylor attended the College of William & Mary. He engaged in private practice in Petersburg, Virginia until 1795, from 1797 to 1798, and from 1800 to 1801. He was a member of the Virginia House of Delegates from 1795 to 1796, and from 1798 to 1799.

Federal judicial service

He was confirmed by the United States Senate on February 20, 1801, and received his commission the same day. His service terminated on July 1, 1802, due to abolition of the court.

Later career and death

Following his departure from the federal bench, Taylor resumed private practice in Petersburg from 1802 to 1815. He died on November 9, 1815, in Petersburg.

References

Sources
 

1769 births
1815 deaths
18th-century American judges
College of William & Mary alumni
Judges of the United States circuit courts
United States federal judges appointed by John Adams